"Twenty Two" is episode 53 of the American television series The Twilight Zone. The story was adapted by Rod Serling from a short anecdote in the 1944 Bennett Cerf Random House anthology Famous Ghost Stories, which itself was an adaptation of "The Bus-Conductor", a short story by E. F. Benson published in The Pall Mall Magazine in 1906. It was one of the six episodes of the second season which was shot on videotape in a short-lived experiment aimed to cut costs, and was directed by Jack Smight.

Opening narration

Plot
Liz Powell awakens in her hospital room by the loud ticking of a clock. She knocks a glass of water to the floor, shattering it, then follows the sound of footsteps into the hall. She sees a nurse, half-hidden in shadow, descend to the basement in the elevator. She follows the nurse down and finds the hospital morgue, room 22. The nurse emerges from the room and says, "Room for one more, honey." Liz screams and flees to the elevator.

Liz awakens, the experience being a nightmare. Liz is a professional dancer, hospitalized for exhaustion, and she has been having the same recurring, vivid nightmare. She insists the dream is really happening to her, although her agent, Barney, seems doubtful. Her doctor tries to assure her this is impossible. He produces the night nurse who attends the morgue, and Liz doesn't recognize her. The doctor suggests Liz try an experiment in lucid dreaming and alter one detail of the dream.

That night, the dream begins again. Liz visualizes a pack of cigarettes next to the glass on the nightstand. When the clock awakens her, she reaches for a cigarette instead of the glass. She drops the lighter, and while reaching to retrieve it, her other hand knocks the glass to the floor. The dream continues as before, ending in the morgue. Liz awakens hysterical, and a nurse is required to hold her down while the doctor sedates her. The doctor tells the nurse it is odd that Liz, who has never seen the real morgue, knows it is room number 22.

After several days, Liz is discharged from the hospital. She goes to the airport to fly to her next booking in Miami Beach. She buys her ticket and is told she will be on Flight 22. She begins experiencing sensory details from the dream: she is thirsty, distracted by the ticking of a clock that only she can hear, bumps into a woman carrying a vase which drops and shatters, and hears loud footsteps. She crosses the tarmac to her plane and climbs the boarding stairs. As she reaches the top, a stewardess identical to the nurse from the dream emerges from the cabin. She says, "Room for one more, honey." Screaming, Liz stumbles down the stairs and races back to the terminal. Outside the terminal, Flight 22 taxis to the runway, takes off—and explodes.

Closing narration

Production
The original 1906 story by E.F. Benson features a large, middle-aged male protagonist named Hugh Grainger from the English country visiting a friend in London. He is haunted by a man dressed like a bus conductor—but driving a horse-drawn hearse. He sees the same man a month later actually driving a bus that is involved in a tremendous auto accident. The 1944 Cerf anecdote features instead a young New York woman visiting the Carolina plantation of distant relatives, with the hearse's coachman eventually revealed to be the operator of a medical building elevator that plummets when its cables break. In the 1944 film, Dead of Night, the protagonist is again male, also with the name Hugh Grainger, haunted by a man driving a hearse, and has a premonition about a fatal bus crash.

As the Twilight Zones second season began, the production was informed by CBS that, at about $65,000 per episode, the show was exceeding its budget. By November 1960, 16 episodes, more than half of the projected 29, were already filmed, and five of those had been broadcast. It was decided that six consecutive episodes (production code #173-3662 through #173-3667) would be videotaped at CBS Television City in the manner of a live drama and eventually transferred to 16-millimeter film for future syndicated rebroadcasts. Eventual savings amounted to only about $30,000 for all six entries, which was judged to be insufficient to offset the loss of depth of visual perspective that, at the time, only film could offer. The shows wound up looking little better than set-bound soap operas and, as a result, the experiment was deemed a failure and never tried again.

References

Sources
DeVoe, Bill. (2008). Trivia from The Twilight Zone. Albany, GA: Bear Manor Media. 
Grams, Martin. (2008). The Twilight Zone: Unlocking the Door to a Television Classic. Churchville, MD: OTR Publishing.

External links

"The Bus-Conductor" at Project Gutenberg Australia
"The Bus-Conductor"
"The Bus-Conductor" at eBooks@Adelaide
Snopes entry on the urban legend based on the Benson story

1961 American television episodes
The Twilight Zone (1959 TV series season 2) episodes
Television episodes written by Rod Serling
Television episodes about nightmares